Mary Townsend was a New Zealand artist  (1822–1869).

Mary Townsend may also refer to:

In chronological order.
 Mary Townsend (entomologist) (1814–1851), American abolitionist and entomologist
 Mary Ashley Townsend (1836–1901), American poet
 Mary Elizabeth Townsend (1841–1918), British philanthropist and co-founder of the "Girls' Friendly Society"
 Mary Townsend Seymour (1876–1957), African-American politician